Holocneminus multiguttatus, is a species of spider of the genus Holocneminus. It is distributed from Sri Lanka to Malaysia and Sulawesi.

See also
 List of Pholcidae species

References

External links
photos

Pholcidae
Spiders of Asia
Arthropods of Indonesia
Arthropods of Malaysia
Arthropods of Sri Lanka
Spiders described in 1905
Taxa named by Eugène Simon